Turris canaliculata is an extinct species of sea snail, a marine gastropod mollusk in the family Turridae, the turrids.

Description
Measurenements of the shell: between 25 mm and 27 mm.

Distribution
Fossils of this marine species were found in Miocene strata in Aquitaine, France..

References

 Benoist É.-A. (1873).- Catalogue synonymique et raisonné des testacés fossiles recueillis dans les faluns miocènes des communes de La Brède et de Saucats.- Actes de la Société Linnéenne de Bordeaux, tome 29, p. 5-78.

External links
 

canaliculata
Gastropods described in 1873